Alaa Ahmad Rasheed ( in Arabic بالعربية  : علاء أحمد رشيد ), born May 8, 1976, in Kuwait,  is a Jordanian rally driver.

Rankings

2013 Season:
 (Dec. 8th) 1st Local Qatar Rally 2012 – 2013 championship – Ford Fiesta RRC  Grp. RRC/2 – 1st overall – starters 6
 (Mar 21st – 23rd ) Kuwait International Rally 2013 – Ford Fiesta – 2nd overall

Jordan Local Rallies 2013:
 1st Jordan Local Rally 2013, 3rd overall and 11th Jordanian

Jordan Local Rallies 2012:
 3rd Jordan Local Rally 2012, 3rd overall and 2nd Jordanian

Gallery

References

1976 births
Living people
Jordanian motorsport people
World Rally Championship drivers